Business Today may refer to:

Business Today (student magazine), an American, non-profit student organization
Business Today (India), an Indian fortnightly business magazine
Business Today (Philippine TV series), 1990–1996 Philippine television public affairs show
Business Today (Australian TV program), 2006–2014 Australian television program
Business Today Egypt, English business magazine published in Cairo, Egypt